Best Collection may refer to:

Literary Awards
Best Collection, British Fantasy Award
Best Collection, Forward Prizes for Poetry

Music
Best Collection (Toni Qattan album)
Best Collection, album by Andy Hui 2005
Best Collection I,  1993-1995 debut album of Mongolian heavy metal band Hurd, from Hurd discography
Best Collection II, Unplugged (1995-1999) Hurd (band)
Coquillage: The Best Collection II Kokia's second greatest hits album 2009
Best Collection, Teddy Afro